Hirst is an English surname. Notable people with the surname include:

 Arthur Stanley Hirst (1883–1930), British entomologist
 Barton Cooke Hirst (1861-1935), American obstetrician
 Ben Hirst, English footballer
 Christopher Hirst (born 1947), British cricketer and educator
 Claude Raguet Hirst (1855–1942), American painter
 Damien Hirst (born 1965), English artist
 David Hirst
 David Hirst (arachnologist), described many species of huntsman spider, based at the South Australian Museum in Adelaide
 David Hirst (footballer) (born 1967), English professional footballer
 David Hirst (journalist) (born 1936), British journalist based in Beirut
 David Hirst (judge) (1925–2011), British Lord Justice of Appeal from 1992 to 1999
 Derek Hirst (born 1948), British historian
 Sir Edmund Langley Hirst (1898–1975), British chemist
 Edward Hirst (1857–1914), British cricketer
 Edward Hirst, English photographer and videographer
 Elín Hirst (born 1960), Icelandic politician
 Emily Hirst (born 1993), Canadian actress
 Ernest Hirst (1855–1933), British cricketeer
 Francis Wrigley Hirst (1873–1953), British journalist and editor of The Economist
 Geoffrey Hirst (1904–1984), British industrialist and politician
 George Hirst
 George Henry Hirst (1879–1933), British politician
 George Herbert Hirst (1871–1954), English professional cricketer
 George Littlewood Hirst (1890–1967), Welsh international rugby union player
 George Hirst (virologist) (1909–1994), American virologist
 George Hirst (footballer) (born 1999), English footballer
 G. M. Hirst (1869–1962), English-American classicist
 Grace Hirst (1805–1901), New Zealand businesswoman
 Henry Hirst (1838–1911), New Zealand politician
 Henry Beck Hirst (1813–1874), American poet
 Hugo Hirst (1863-1943), British industrialist
 Ivan Hirst (1916–2000), British Army officer instrumental in reviving Volkswagen in post-war Germany
 Jack Hirst, British rugby player
 Jack Hirst (1936–2012), British rugby player
 Jemmy Hirst (1738–1829), English eccentric
 Joe Hirst (born 1987), British rugby player
 Joseph Hirst (1863–1945), British architect
 John Hirst
 John Hirst (born 1947), British businessman
 John Hirst (born 1950), British killer and campaigner for prisoners' rights
 John Hirst, Australian academic and historian.
 John Hirst (born 1970), rugby league footballer of the 1980s and 1990s for Wakefield Trinity
 John Malcolm Hirst (1921–1997), British aerobiologist, agricultural botanist, and mycologist
 Judy Hirst, British biologist
 Kenneth Hirst (1940–2008), British rugby league footballer
 Keegan Hirst (born 1988), British rugby league footballer
 Larry Hirst (born 1951), British businessman.
 Mark Hirst, British journalist
 Maude Hirst, English Actress
 Michael Hirst (1933–2017), British art historian.
 Michael Hirst (born 1946), Scottish Conservative and Unionist Party politician
 Michael Hirst (born 1952), English screenwriter
 Nicky Hirst (born 1963), English sculptor and artist
 Olive Hirst (1912–1994), English advertising agent
 Paul Hirst (1947–2003), British sociologist
 Rob Hirst (born 1956), Australian musician
 Shakespeare Hirst (1841–1907), British actor and author
 Shari Decter Hirst, Canadian politician
 Stephanie Hirst (born 1975), British radio presenter
 Thomas Hirst (1865–1927), British cricketer
 Thomas Archer Hirst (1830–1892), British mathematician
 Tony Hirst (born 1967), British actor and stage director
 Tony Hirst, British academic and blogger
 Ursula Hirst (1909–2002), British actress
 William Hirst (1873–1946), British politician

See also
 Hirst (disambiguation)
 Hearst (surname)
 Hurst (surname)

References

English-language surnames